Morley Bartnoff (born 1959, in Los Angeles, California), is an American keyboardist, guitarist, songwriter, and composer who has been performing and recording for the past 30 years.  Formerly with the Los Angeles rock band Burning Sensations, Morley now leads alternative rock band Cosmo Topper, and whenever possible serves as the "secret weapon" on keyboards for Dramarama, an enduring power pop band best known for its hits "Anything, Anything (I'll Give You)" and "Last Cigarette".  For the last few years Morley has been playing keys for the reunited group Dramarama and will be featured on the New Dramarama recording, playing Baby Grand Piano and a Hammond B 3, with a Leslie to be released in 2011. His talents have also appeared on their previous 2005 CD, Everybody Dies.

In addition, Morley's songs have been appearing in motion pictures.  His original track "For... The Time Being," from the Cosmo Topper CD Pure Fast Vibration, is heard during the end credits of Mayor of the Sunset Strip, a rock documentary examining the life and career of legendary KROQ-FM DJ Rodney "On the 'ROQ" Bingenheimer, produced by Dramarama's Chris Carter.

A few additional bands Bartnoff's talents have been a part of are Pasteurized Ashtray, Waterfall, Who's The Father?, Joe Thomas, The Sluff Bros., Cantaloupe Without a Ladder, Franny and Zowie, Playing Cards, Bugs Tomorrow, Andy and the Rattlesnakes, Burning Sensations, The Rugz With Ike Willis, Nick Varoom's Tomb, Mesuganah Soul Review, Talkback, Push-Start Jungle, Daisychain, The Negro Problem, The Stew Ensemble, and of course his own band Cosmo Topper, whose song "For The Time Being" closes the Rock Documentary "Mayor of the Sunset Strip"

Bartnoff is currently appearing as the keyboardist in "Just Imagine", a tribute to rock legend John Lennon at Planet Hollywood Resort & Casino in Las Vegas, after successful runs in North Hollywood at the No Ho Valley Arts District and Platinum Live in Studio City, California. www.justimaginetheshow.com

References 

Living people
American male composers
20th-century American composers
American rock keyboardists
American rock guitarists
American male guitarists
1959 births
20th-century American guitarists
Dramarama members
20th-century American male musicians